Larry or Lawrence Kent may refer to:

 Larry Kent (actor) (1900–1967), American film actor and producer
 Larry Kent (filmmaker) (born 1937), Canadian filmmaker
 Larry Kent, a book series by Cleveland Publishing